Mount Stirling is a historic plantation house located at Providence Forge, Charles City County, Virginia. It was built in 1851, and is a -story, red brick, Greek Revival style plantation house. It features a small-scale Greek Ionic order portico and stepped gable parapets. Also on the property is a contributing altered kitchen building.  The house sits among formally landscaped grounds undertaken in the 1940s. The plantation was the scene of significant activity during the American Civil War, as Union soldiers occupied the house in 1862 and again in 1864.

It was added to the National Register of Historic Places in 1993.

References 

Plantation houses in Virginia
Houses on the National Register of Historic Places in Virginia
Greek Revival houses in Virginia
Houses completed in 1851
Houses in Charles City County, Virginia
National Register of Historic Places in Charles City County, Virginia
1851 establishments in Virginia